KXNB-LP (101.3 FM) is a low power radio station broadcasting an urban contemporary format. The station is operated by The Malcolm X Memorial Foundation. The station serves northern Omaha. A ribbon cutting ceremony for the station was held in 2017.

References

External links
 
 

XNB-LP
Radio stations established in 2016
Urban contemporary radio stations in the United States
XNB-LP
2016 establishments in Nebraska